The National Board of Trade is a government agency in Sweden that answers to the Ministry for Foreign Affairs. The agency is located in Stockholm.

The National Board of Trade deals with foreign trade, the internal market and trade policy. The board provides the Swedish government with analyses and recommendations. It was founded in 1651.

See also
Government agencies in Sweden

External links
Swedish National Board of Trade - Official site

1651 establishments in Sweden
Organizations established in 1651
Board of Trade
Christina, Queen of Sweden
Foreign trade of Sweden
Sweden